The 1981 Porsche Tennis Grand Prix was a women's singles tennis tournament played on indoor carpet courts at the Tennis Sporthalle Filderstadt in Filderstadt in West Germany. The event was part of the Category 4 tier of the 1981 Toyota Series. It was the fourth edition of the tournament and was held from 26 October through 1 November 1981. First-seeded Tracy Austin won the singles event, her fourth successive singles title at the event, and the accompanying $22,000 first-prize money.

Finals

Singles
 Tracy Austin defeated  Martina Navratilova 4–6, 6–3, 6–4
It was Austin's 6th title of the year and the 25th of her career.

Doubles
 Mima Jaušovec /  Martina Navratilova defeated  Barbara Potter /  Anne Smith 6–4, 6–1

Prize money

Notes

References

External links
 
 International Tennis Federation (ITF) tournament event details

Porsche Tennis Grand Prix
1981 in West German sport
Porsche Tennis Grand Prix
October 1981 sports events in Europe
November 1981 sports events in Europe
1980s in Baden-Württemberg
German
Porsch